Kim Hyun-hun (born 30 April 1991) is a South Korean footballer who plays as centre back for Suwon FC in K League 1.

Club statistics
As of 23 February 2022.

References

External links
 

 Profile at Avispa Fukuoka

1991 births
Living people
Association football defenders
South Korean footballers
South Korean expatriate footballers
J1 League players
J2 League players
China League One players
K League 1 players
K League 2 players
JEF United Chiba players
Avispa Fukuoka players
Yunnan Flying Tigers F.C. players
Gyeongnam FC players
Gyeongju Citizen FC players
Seoul E-Land FC players
Gwangju FC players
Suwon FC players
Expatriate footballers in Japan
South Korean expatriate sportspeople in Japan
Expatriate footballers in China
South Korean expatriate sportspeople in China